The term North derby is sometimes used to emphasise their relative geographical proximity, when matches are played between Scottish football clubs Aberdeen and Inverness Caledonian Thistle. The clubs first met in a Scottish League Cup tie played on 8 August 1998. Inverness first entered the Scottish Football League in 1994 alongside fellow Highland side Ross County, forming the Highland derby. However, Inverness progressed over the next 10 years to form a rivalry with Aberdeen, after winning promotion to the Scottish Premier League in 2004.

The match is considered to be a derby despite the fact that the two cities are over 100 miles apart. Aberdeen have no immediate rival geographically, although they have a longstanding rivalry with Rangers and another with Dundee United, who have frequently competed with them for Scottish major trophies.

Before Ross County were promoted to the SPL in 2012, the lack of an alternative derby opponent for both clubs led to the development of the rivalry. Due to the redevelopment of the Caledonian Stadium to meet SPL standard, Inverness had to share Pittodrie Stadium with Aberdeen during the first half of the 2004–05 league season.

Initially, the match has also been given an edge by Aberdeen enjoying a long unbeaten record against Inverness, partly thanks to a remarkable number of very late goals. This record was finally ended on the opening day of the 2008–09 league season when Inverness won 2–0 at Pittodrie. Other notable matches between the two clubs include a Scottish Cup tie in 2000. Aberdeen beat Inverness after a replay in the round after Inverness had caused a great shock by beating Celtic.

The clubs met on 16 March 2014 in their most high-profile game to date, the 2014 Scottish League Cup Final, with Aberdeen winning on penalties after a 0–0 draw (aet).

Matches played

Head-to-head summary

Goalscorer records
Players with 3 or more goals in the North derby.

Notes

Scotland football derbies
Aberdeen F.C.
Inverness Caledonian Thistle F.C.